The following is a list of the 564 communes of the Saône-et-Loire department of France.

The communes cooperate in the following intercommunalities (as of 2020):
Communauté urbaine Creusot Montceau
Communauté d'agglomération Beaune Côte et Sud (partly)
Communauté d'agglomération Le Grand Chalon
Communauté d'agglomération Mâconnais Beaujolais Agglomération (partly)
Communauté de communes Bresse Louhannaise Intercom'
Communauté de communes Bresse Nord Intercom'
Communauté de communes Bresse Revermont 71
Communauté de communes du Canton de Semur-en-Brionnais
Communauté de communes La Clayette Chauffailles en Brionnais
Communauté de communes du Clunisois
Communauté de communes Entre Arroux, Loire et Somme
Communauté de communes Entre Saône et Grosne
Communauté de communes du Grand Autunois Morvan
Communauté de communes Le Grand Charolais (partly)
Communauté de communes Mâconnais-Tournugeois
Communauté de communes de Marcigny
Communauté de communes Saint-Cyr Mère Boitier entre Charolais et Mâconnais
Communauté de communes Saône Doubs Bresse
Communauté de communes Sud Côte Chalonnaise
Communauté de communes Terres de Bresse

References

Saône-et-Loire